Dahme is a municipality in the district of Ostholstein, in Schleswig-Holstein, Germany. It is a beach resort town on the Bay of Lübeck.

References

Municipalities in Schleswig-Holstein
Ostholstein
Populated coastal places in Germany (Baltic Sea)